Space Ace 21 is a video game published by Synergistic Solar, Inc.

Development
Space Ace 21 is a game involving combat between two spaceships, played in either two or three dimensions.

Gameplay
Space Ace 21 is a game where players construct modular spacecraft from a set of modules and test the design in simulated realistic physics based 3d or 2d stop action combat

Reception
Ian Chadwick reviewed Space Ace 21 in Ares Magazine #13 and commented that "Space Ace 21 is highly recommended for the science fiction game buff tired of arcade shootouts and looking for a more realistic bit of fun."

References

External links
Review in 80 Micro

1981 video games
Shoot 'em ups
Space combat simulators
TRS-80 games
TRS-80-only games
Video games developed in the United States